Arro may refer to:
Arro, a commune on the island of Corsica

Arro, Champhai, a village in Mizoram
 surname
Edgar Arro (1911–1978), Estonian composer
Kristjan Arro (1885–1942), Estonian agriculturist and politician
Lembit Arro (born 1930), Estonian politician
Kalev Arro (1915–1974), Estonian partisan
Mikk-Mihkel Arro (born 1984), Estonian decathlete

Estonian-language surnames